The Absheron gas field is an offshore natural gas field in the Caspian Sea.

Partners of the Absheron field are Total S.A. (40%), SOCAR (40%), and GDF Suez (20%). Operator of the field is Total.

History
The Absheron block was discovered as a result of seismic exploration by Azerbaijani scientists in 1960 and was commissioned for exploration works in 1993. The first production sharing agreement on the Absheron field was signed between SOCAR and ChevronTexaco on August 1, 1997.

The new contract between Total and SOCAR was signed on February 27, 2009.  The agreement which oversaw drilling of three exploration wells within the next three years was ratified by Azerbaijani Parliament in mid May, 2009.  Later GDF Suez acquired 20% stake from Total.  The area stipulated in the agreement covered .

Reserves
According to Azerbaijani authorities, the production is likely to begin in 2021–2022.

Significance
The discovery of vast gas reserves at Absheron field will positively affect the job market in Azerbaijan and significantly boost the Azerbaijani economy.  According to experts, Nabucco project may be realized on the basis of Azerbaijani gas alone if this find is exploited properly by Total, which also holds a 10% stake in South Caucasus Pipeline Consortium.

After the selection TAP as main pipeline to deliver natural gas from Azerbaijan to Europe, Absheron field has diminished its significance since the capacity of the pipeline will not need additional volumes of gas.

References

Natural gas fields in Azerbaijan
Caspian Sea
TotalEnergies
Engie oil and gas fields